Arnaldo Horacio Arocha Vargas (10 September 1936 – 8 February 2022) was a Venezuelan politician. A member of Copei, he served as Governor of Miranda from 1971 to 1974 and again from 1990 to 1995. He also served in the Venezuelan Chamber of Deputies from 1969 to 1974 and again from 1984 to 1989. He died on 8 February 2022, at the age of 85.

References

1936 births
2022 deaths
Copei politicians
Members of the Venezuelan Chamber of Deputies
Governors of Miranda (state)
20th-century Venezuelan politicians
People from Miranda (state)
People from Caracas